Sio Siua Taukeiaho (born 3 January 1992) is a professional rugby league footballer who plays as a  or  for the Catalans Dragons in the Super League. He plays for Tonga and played for New Zealand at international level.

He previously played for the Sydney Roosters and New Zealand Warriors in the National Rugby League (NRL). He won back-to-back NRL premierships with the Roosters in 2018 and 2019.

Background
Taukeiaho was born in Ōtara, South Auckland, New Zealand.

Playing career
Taukeiaho is of Tongan descent and played for the Otara Scorpions in 2010 before being signed by the New Zealand Warriors. 

He played in the 2011 Toyota Cup winning Junior Warriors and was named in the Junior Kiwis that year.

He made his first grade debut in round 26 against the St. George Illawarra Dragons on 7 September 2013.

At the end of the 2013 season he requested, and was granted, his release from the Warriors. Taukeiaho would then tweet on 27 September 2013 that he signed with the Roosters for two years. 

Taukeiaho came into the 2015 NRL season as the Roosters' replacement for the departed Sonny Bill Williams. Taukeiaho was a surprise inclusion on the interchange to start the 2015 season, his great early form cemented his spot as he went on to play every game of the season, scoring 2 tries.

Taukeiaho played for Tonga against Papua New Guinea in an end of year test match in the PNG while on 2 May 2015 in the Gold Coast, he played for Tonga in their Polynesian Cup clash with Pacific rivals Samoa.

On 30 September 2018, Taukeiaho played in Eastern Suburbs 21–6 victory over Melbourne in the 2018 NRL grand final.

Taukeiaho made a total of 20 appearances for the Sydney Roosters in the 2019 NRL season as the club finished second on the table and qualified for the finals. Taukeiaho played from the bench in the 2019 NRL Grand Final as the Sydney Roosters won their second consecutive premiership defeating Canberra 14–8 at ANZ Stadium.

On 2 November 2019, Taukeiaho captained Tonga against Australia as they went on to win 16–12, causing one of the biggest upsets in international rugby league history.

He played a total of 21 games for the Sydney Roosters in the 2021 NRL season including the club's two finals matches. The Sydney Roosters would be eliminated from the second week of the finals losing to Manly 42-6.

References

External links

Sydney Roosters profile
Roosters profile
2017 RLWC profile

1992 births
Living people
Auckland rugby league team players
Catalans Dragons players
Junior Kiwis players
New Zealand national rugby league team players
New Zealand sportspeople of Tongan descent
New Zealand rugby league players
New Zealand Warriors players
Otara Scorpions players
Rugby league locks
Rugby league players from Auckland
Rugby league second-rows
Sydney Roosters players
Tonga national rugby league team captains
Tonga national rugby league team players
Tongan sportspeople